Isma'ilism is a branch or sub-sect of Shia Islam. The Ismailis get their name from their acceptance of Imam Ismaʻil ibn Jafar.

Ismaili is also a common surname or patronymic meaning coming from Ismail or Ishmael, the first son of Prophet Abraham. It may also be use as Al-Ismaili with the Arabic definite article al- meaning "The Ismaili".

People with the surname include:

Ismaili
Abas Ismaili (born 1967), Iranian former cyclist
Florijana Ismaili (1995–2019), Swiss footballer of Albanian origin
Ismail Ismaili (born 1981), Macedonian footballer of ethnic Albanian origin
Rashidah Ismaili, also known as Rashidah Ismaili AbuBakr (born 1941), Benin poet, fiction writer, essayist and playwright
Shaban Ismaili (born 1989), Macedonian footballer

Ismaily
Ismaily (footballer), full name Ismaily Gonçalves dos Santos (born 1990), Brazilian footballer

Al-Ismaili
Hamyar Nasser Al-Ismaili (born 1953), Omani businessman, former footballer, football club president

Al-Ismaily
Salem Ben Nasser Al-Ismaily, Omani businessman

See also
Ismaili (disambiguation)